Lawrence Calvin Demery (born June 4, 1953) is an American former Major League Baseball pitcher. He played all or part of four seasons in the majors, from  until , for the Pittsburgh Pirates.

A native of Bakersfield, California, Demery was the son of fellow major leaguer Art Demery. He played baseball at Wasco High School and later at Locke High School in Los Angeles, where he threw two no-hitters. Demery played college baseball at Nebraska and was drafted by the Pirates in 1972. He began his professional career that year with the Gastonia Pirates and walked more batters than any other pitcher in the Western Carolinas League. He spent most of the following season in the Carolina League, which he led with fourteen complete games.

Demery made his Major League debut on June 2, 1974, against the Cincinnati Reds. He entered in relief of Bruce Kison at Riverfront Stadium and struck out four of the six batters he faced without allowing a run.

, Demery lived in Bakersfield, California.

He appeared in the 2014 film No No: A Dockumentary.

References

External links

1953 births
Living people
African-American baseball players
Major League Baseball pitchers
Pittsburgh Pirates players
Gastonia Pirates players
Salem Pirates players
Navegantes del Magallanes players
American expatriate baseball players in Venezuela
Charleston Charlies players
Shreveport Captains players
Columbus Clippers players
Savannah Braves players
Baseball players from California
21st-century African-American people
20th-century African-American sportspeople